Gorenja Žetina is a small settlement in the Municipality of Gorenja Vas–Poljane in the Upper Carniola region of Slovenia. It lies at the foot of Mount Blegoš and is a somewhat popular starting point for hikes to its peak.

References

External links 

Gorenja Žetina on Geopedia

Populated places in the Municipality of Gorenja vas-Poljane